The Remixes is the first remix album of the Japanese pop rock group Every Little Thing, released on September 17, 1997.

Track listing
 "Feel My Heart" (Plasma Mix) – 7:38
 "Season" (Cloudy Skies Mix) – 7:41
 "I'll get over You" (Intensive Mix) – 5:23
 "Looking Back on Your Love" (Groove That Soul Mix) – 5:16
 "Here and Everywhere" (Super Bootbeat Mix) – 6:12
 "Future World" (Right Attitude Remix) – 8:33
 "Dear My Friend" ('97 Pumped Up Mix) – 5:54
 "Never Stop!" (Satoshi's Summer Breeze Mix) – 5:07
 "I'll get over You" (Lightfoot's Down Beat Mix) – 5:47
  (Trip Strip Mix) – 6:59
 "Future World" (Further Contact Mix) – 7:48

Chart positions

External links
 The Remixes information at Avex Network.
 The Remixes information at Oricon.
 The Remixes information at Mora.jp (song length)

Every Little Thing (band) albums
1997 remix albums